George Weston (born August 10, 1931 – October 31, 2006) was an American singer.

Early life
He was born in Los Angeles, California and was raised on a farm in Little Rock, California.

Career
His first record was for Tally Records, but found little success. Months later, he recorded for Jackpot (Challenge Records Subsidiary) and found success for his record - "Hey Little Car Hop" / "Well, Don't You Know". A year later, he recorded for Challenge Records, and Glenn Records. In the late 1960s he made a few songs with some friends, but they didn't get released until years later. In the 1970s, George bought a plane and flew around America. He played in concerts and recorded, but a breakout hit eluded him.

Discography
Hold Still Baby / I Need You Baby - Tally Records / year-1958

Hey Little Car Hop / Well, Don't You Know - Jackpot / year-1958

Shelly, Shelly / My Foolish Pride - Jackpot / year-1959

Sneakin' / Thirteenth Child - Glenn Records / year-1960

Too Good To Be True / Dead Man - Challenge / year-1960

Fishin / Don't Stay Home With The Blues / year-1960 (either released on Challenge or Glenn)

Searcher / Kilo / Let The Crying Happen / Nine Times Out Of Ten / Self - unissued, recorded circa 1967-1968.

References

1931 births
Singers from Los Angeles
2006 deaths